The non-existent Buenaventura River, alternatively San Buenaventura River or Río Buenaventura, was once believed to run from the Rocky Mountains to the Pacific Ocean through the Great Basin region of what is now the western United States. The river was chronologically the last of several imagined incarnations of an imagined Great River of the West which would be for North America west of the Rockies what the Mississippi River was east of the Rockies. The hopes were to find a waterway from coast to coast, sparing the traveling around Cape Horn at the tip of South America.

Dominguez, Vélez de Escalante and Miera
In 1776, two Franciscan missionaries Atanasio Domínguez and Silvestre Vélez de Escalante sought to find a land route between Santa Fe in Nuevo México to Monterey in Alta California. They were part of what has become known as the Dominguez–Escalante Expedition, a ten-man expedition including Bernardo de Miera y Pacheco (Miera) acting as the cartographer. On September 13, they encountered what is now called the Green River in modern day Utah, a southward-flowing tributary of the Colorado and named it San Buenaventura after  the catholic saint Bonaventure.

At that point in time, there was nothing mythical about the Buenaventura River. Dominguez and Vélez de Escalante's journal correctly notes that above their crossing, the river flowed toward the west. It flowed generally southwest where they crossed it and continued southwest as they traveled in its vicinity. Escalante also correctly recorded that after its junction with the Rio San Clemente (today's White River? – which he also named) the Buenaventura River turned to the south. So, the original Buenaventura River is real and exists today under a different name.

After establishing contact with a branch of the Ute (Yutahs) Tribe on the south shore of what they called Lake Timpanogos (various spellings), now called "Utah Lake," the expedition turned south-southwest. On September 29, they were surprised to come upon a river (the Sevier River) flowing from the south-southeast, and turned toward the west at the point where they encountered it. Dominguez and Vélez de Escalante noted in their journal that the Native American name for this river suggested it was the same river they had named Buenaventura. They expressed doubts it was the same river because had it been so, it was substantially smaller downstream than it had been upstream--the opposite of the normal pattern. They named this river the Rio San Ysabel. The Native Americans told them it flowed west from there into a lake (Sevier Lake) and beyond.  The Sevier Lake has no outlet, so the indigenes may have been referring to the west-flowing Humboldt River, which originates over 150 miles northwest, and were misinterpreted by the explorers.

Despite Dominguez and Vélez de Escalante's doubts that the Green and Sevier Rivers were one and the same, the maps Miera produced do not include the Rio San Ysabel and depict the Buenaventura flowing southwest from where they encountered it in northeastern Utah, to the Sevier Lake in west-central Utah. In an accompanying note to king Charles III of Spain, Miera recommended building several missions in the area and mentioned the possibility of a water way to the Pacific Ocean, via the Buenaventura or the Timpanogos River: the river Miera depicts on his map as flowing west from the Great Salt Lake (GSL).  Although Miera documented a correct description of the GSL given to them by the indigenes the Spanish assumed that what they thought had been described was incorrect and interpreted their description of the "extremely salty" lake as the ocean and assumed that the description of the river flowing from "Lake Timpanogos", which is the Jordan River flowing between Utah Lake and the Great Salt Lake, was of a waterway to the Pacific.

The error of depicting the Buenaventura as flowing southwest to a lake was perpetuated by early explorers and cartographers such as Alexander von Humboldt, who used a map from the Dominguez and Escalanté expedition to prepare his maps in 1804 and 1809.  Zebulon Pike used Humboldt's maps to prepare his map for his book from 1810. Aaron Arrowsmith in 1814 published a map depicting the Buenaventura flowing to "Lac Sale".  These cartographers conservatively did not try to chart the area west of that explored by Dominguez and Escalante.

Extending the Buenaventura West to the Pacific

There had long been a hope that a river flowing west from the Rocky Mountains to the Pacific Ocean would provide an easy route for travel and trade. This dream was the descendant of the long sought Northwest Passage.  When Francisco Garcés drew his maps of Alta California, he did not understand the nature of the Sierra Nevada, and he drew the "San Felipe" or San Joaquin River originating beyond the Sierras in the Great Basin and flowing to the Pacific Ocean, in or near San Francisco Bay. Then, when Manuel Augustin Mascaro and Miguel Constanso made the first map of the whole Viceroyalty of New Spain  (1784), they extended the "San Felipe" almost to the Sevier Lake.  A similar map was published in 1820 by Sidney E. Morse showing the Rio de San Buenaventura flowing into a lake, the western limits of which are unknown. This map shows the "Supposed river between the Buenaventura and the Bay of Francisco, which will probably be the communication between the Atlantic and the Pacific" toward this lake, but quite not connecting with it. A map by J. Finlayson (1822) shows a Rio de S. Buenaventura originating near the " source of the Rio Colorado" and emptying into a salt lake the western limits of which "are unknown". This same map indicates that an uncharted Rio de San Filipe crosses a range of mountains at 122 degrees west longitude.

Other cartographers began to boldly assert that rivers flowed from Lake Timpanogos and "Lac Salado" to the Pacific Ocean.  Henry S. Tanner's influential map of 1822 shows the Buenaventura River flowing from the north central Rockies through the Sevier Lake to the Pacific Ocean south of Monterey Bay. This map also shows two rivers flowing from Lake Timpanogos, (Utah Lake) one to San Francisco Bay (the R. Timpanogos), the other to Port Orford, Oregon (the Los Mongos R.) where the Rogue River enters the Pacific.  A similar map by Anthony Finley was published in 1826  A map by Thomas Bradford (1835) shows a river flowing to San Francisco Bay (labeled as "Port Sir Francis Drake" in a region Bradford called "New Albion") from the south end of Lake Timpanogos. There is no reference to Rio de San Buenaventura.   An 1844 map by James Bowden shows a landlocked Buenaventura wrapping around the southeast side of a "doubtful" Lake Timpanogos.

Explorations to find the Buenaventura

The Great Salt Lake (GSL) was first seen and reported as very saline by white North Americans in 1824, apparently independently by Jim Bridger and Etienne Provost. Upon learning of the GSL, explorers began equating Lake Timpanogos on the maps with it and, apparently unaware of the fact that saline lakes such as the Great Salt and Sevier Lakes have no outlets,  began efforts to find the rivers flowing from them west to the Pacific as promised by maps such as Tanner's.

In 1825, William H. Ashley attempted to float the Green (Buenaventura) River to either what was called "Salt Lake" (actually Sevier Lake) on Tanner's map, or the Colorado River, to which the fur traders suspected it flowed.  He started in present-day Wyoming, and after passing through the treacherous Gates of Lodore, aborted the trip prior to entering Desolation Canyon.  Despite not having gotten close to the Colorado River, he concluded that the Green did empty into it, and continued his exploration by engaging Provost to lead him on an overland excursion to observe the GSL.  The next spring his partner, Jedediah Smith, explored areas the north and west of the GSL, but found no rivers flowing from it.  He sent more men to float around the shoreline to the west and south, and they were also unsuccessful in finding the "Los Mongos R." and "R. Timpanogos". However, this information was delayed in reaching cartographers, and in 1836 Tanner repeated the depictions of the three rivers, except he identified the "R. Timpanogos" as "R. S. Sacramento ou (or) Timpanogos". So, when, in 1841, John Bidwell embarked over the Rocky Mountains to California, he was advised to take carpenters tools with them, to build canoes and sail from the GSL to the Pacific.

After Ashley retired from the fur trade his partnership with Smith was bought out by Smith and two new partners, Smith focused on finding the Buenaventura.  In 1826, he led an expedition south from southern Idaho, and upon reaching the mouth of the Jordan River on the southeast end of the GSL, traveled south along to the east side of Utah Lake.  Since he identified the Jordan River as the outlet of Utah Lake, he did not explore the lake further.  He encountered the Sevier River on its northeast-flowing stretch, and assuming it continued to flow north to Utah Lake, dismissed it as the possible Buenaventura and continued southwest to Southern California.  In 1827 and 1828 he tracked the western flank of the Sierra Nevada in its full length, without registering a river that passed through the range, but he heard the Sacramento River referenced as the "Buenaventura" by Luis Antonio Argüello.  A map by Albert Gallatin (1836), based on information from Smith's travels, labels the Sacramento River as the Buenaventura and equated Lake Timpanogos with the GSL, but did not try to connect the two.

In the spring of 1827, Daniel Potts, a fur trader in the employ of Smith, encountered the Sevier River downstream from the point Smith had the previous summer.  He continued to follow the river downstream to the Sevier Lake, which he confirmed was a saline lake, but did not try to circumvent it to find an outlet.  He instead followed the entire course of the river upstream to its head. 

The Buenaventura River's existence or non-existence was a matter of controversy until 1843, when John Charles Frémont, with Thomas Fitzpatrick and Kit Carson as scouts, led a perilous expedition from the Columbia River to Sacramento, California via the Sierra Nevada. By that time the fact that the Buenaventura River did not flow from the headwaters of the Colorado/Green River was well established among the trappers and guides, but maps continued to show it and other rivers flowing from the region of Great Salt Lake to the sea. On January 27, 1844 at Walker River, he briefly believed himself to have found the mythical river, but it was the result of a faulty measurement. Two days later he discovered his mistake and definitively proved that the Buenaventura did not exist.  Upon later finding the Salinas River flowed into the Pacific at about the same point the maps depicted the mouth of the Buenaventura, Frémont concluded that it was the source of the legend and applied the name "Rio San Buenaventura" to it.

After Frémont established that no rivers flowed across the Great Basin region to the Pacific, President Polk was reluctant to accept his conclusion. However, after the premise was accepted that no east to west waterway flowed across the interior of the western United States, Frémont and his father-in-law and political sponsor, Senator Thomas Hart Benton, directed their ambitions to a transcontinental railway, which was completed in 1869, after the Mexican–American War of 1846–48 and the American Civil War.

Notes

References

Further reading 
 C. Gregory Crampton, The San Buenaventura − Mythical River of the West, in: Pacific Historical Review, Vol. 25, 2 (1956 May), p. 163-171

American folklore
American frontier
The Californias
Geography of the Western United States
Green River (Colorado River tributary)
History of geography
History of the American West
New Spain
Western United States in fiction